Aleksandr Chizh (born 10 February 1997) is a Belarusian professional footballer who plays for Torpedo-BelAZ Zhodino.

References

External links 
 
 

1997 births
Living people
Belarusian footballers
Belarus under-21 international footballers
Association football midfielders
Belarusian expatriate footballers
Expatriate footballers in Kazakhstan
FC Dinamo Minsk players
FC Naftan Novopolotsk players
FC Turan players
FC Torpedo-BelAZ Zhodino players